The FIDE Grand Prix 2012–13 was a series of six chess tournaments that formed part of the qualification cycle for the World Chess Championship 2014. Veselin Topalov finished first, and Shakhriyar Mamedyarov second in the overall standings. Both therefore qualified for the 2014 Candidates Tournament.

Format
Eighteen top players were selected to compete in these tournaments. Each player agrees and will contract to participate in four of these tournaments.

Each tournament is a 12-player, single round-robin tournament. This is a change to the 14 player tournaments last cycle. In each round players scored 1 point for a win, ½ point for a draw and 0 for a loss. Grand Prix points were then allocated according to each player's standing in the tournament: 170 Grand Prix points for first place, 140 for second place, 110 for third place, and then 90 down to 10 points by steps of 10. In case of a tie in points the Grand Prix points are shared evenly by the tied players.
Only the three best tournament results of each player are counted. The player with the most Grand Prix points is the winner.

Players and qualification
The three highest ranked players on the FIDE rating list chose not to enter the Grand Prix. Those are world No. 1 Magnus Carlsen, 2008–2010 Grand Prix winner Levon Aronian and ex-world champion Vladimir Kramnik. World Champion Viswanathan Anand also declined participation. There were several ways to qualify for the Grand Prix series:

Prize money and Grand Prix points
The prize money is €170,000 per single Grand Prix and €420,000 for the overall Grand Prix finishes.

Tie breaks
With the objective of determining qualifiers to play in the Candidates 2014, and in the case that two or more players have equal cumulative points at the top, the following criteria were utilized to decide the overall Series winner and other overall placings:
 Ranking points of the fourth result not already taken in the top three ranking results.
 Number of actual game result points scored in the best three tournaments.
 Game points of the fourth result not already taken in the top three results.
 Number of wins.
 Drawing of lots.

Schedule
The six tournaments were:

The third stage of the Grand Prix was initially to be held in Lisbon, Portugal.

The fourth stage of the Grand Prix was initially to be held in Madrid, Spain.

The fifth stage of the Grand Prix was initially to be held in Berlin, Germany.

Events crosstables

London 2012
{| class="wikitable" style="text-align:center;"
|+ 1st stage, London, England, 21 September – 3 October 2012
! !! Player !! Rating !! 1 !! 2 !! 3 !! 4 !! 5 !! 6 !! 7 !! 8 !! 9 !! 10 !! 11 !! 12 !! Total !! SB !! TPR !! GP
|-
|-style="background:#ccffcc;"
| 1 || align=left |  || 2752
| X || ½ || ½ || ½ || ½ || ½ || ½ || 1 || ½ || 1 || 1 || ½ || 7 || 36.25 || 2834 || 140
|-
|-style="background:#ccffcc;"
| 2 || align=left |  || 2738
| ½ || X || ½ || 0 || ½ || 1 || 1 || ½ || 1 || ½ || ½ || 1 || 7 || 35.75 || 2836 || 140
|-
|-style="background:#ccffcc;"
| 3 || align=left |  || 2729
| ½ || ½ || X || 0 || ½ || ½ || ½ || ½ || 1 || 1 || 1 || 1 || 7 || 34.75 || 2836 || 140
|-
| 4 || align=left |  || 2754
| ½ || 1 || 1 || X || ½ || ½ || ½ || ½ || ½ || ½ || ½ || ½ || 6½ || 36.75 || 2801 || 90
|-
| 5 || align=left |  || 2737
| ½ || ½ || ½ || ½ || X || ½ || ½ || 1 || ½ || ½ || ½ || ½ || 6 || 32.50 || 2770 || 80
|-
| 6 || align=left |  || 2742
| ½ || 0 || ½ || ½ || ½ || X || ½ || ½ || ½ || ½ || ½ || 1 || 5½ || 28.75 || 2739 || 70
|-
| 7 || align=left |  || 2722
| ½ || 0 || ½ || ½ || ½ || ½ || X || ½ || 0 || ½ || ½ || 1 || 5 || 26.75 || 2709 || 55
|-
| 8 || align=left |  || 2769
| 0 || ½ || ½ || ½ || 0 || ½ || ½ || X || ½ || ½ || ½ || 1 || 5 || 26.00 || 2705 || 55
|-
| 9 || align=left |  || 2684
| ½ || 0 || 0 || ½ || ½ || ½ || 1 || ½ || X || ½ || ½ || 0 || 4½ || 24.25 || 2680 || 35
|-
| 10 || align=left |  || 2725
| 0 || ½ || 0 || ½ || ½ || ½ || ½ || ½ || ½ || X || ½ || ½ || 4½ || 23.75 || 2677 || 35
|-
| 11 || align=left |  || 2730
| 0 || ½ || 0 || ½ || ½ || ½ || ½ || ½ || ½ || ½ || X || 0 || 4 || 22.00 || 2643 || 15
|-
| 12 || align=left |  || 2783
| ½ || 0 || 0 || ½ || ½ || 0 || 0 || 0 || 1 || ½ || 1 || X || 4 || 20.50 || 2638 || 15
|}

Tashkent 2012
{| class="wikitable" style="text-align:center;"
|+ 2nd stage, Tashkent, Uzbekistan, 22 November – 4 December 2012
! !! Player !! Rating !! 1 !! 2 !! 3 !! 4 !! 5 !! 6 !! 7 !! 8 !! 9 !! 10 !! 11 !! 12 !! Total !! H2H !! Wins !! SB !! TPR !! GP
|-
|-style="background:#ccffcc;"
| 1 || align=left |  || 2775
| X || ½ || 1 || ½ || 0 || ½ || ½ || ½ || 1 || ½ || 1 || ½ || 6½ || 1.5 || 3 || 34.75 || 2808 || 140
|-
|-style="background:#ccffcc;"
| 2 || align=left |  || 2737
| ½ || X || ½ || 1 || 1 || 0 || ½ || ½ || ½ || ½ || ½ || 1 || 6½ || 1 || 3 || 34.50 || 2811 || 140
|-
|-style="background:#ccffcc;"
| 3 || align=left |  || 2748
| 0 || ½ || X || 1 || ½ || ½ || ½ || 1 || 0 || ½ || 1 || 1 || 6½ || 0.5 || 4 || 33.25 || 2810 || 140
|-
| 4 || align=left |  || 2786
| ½ || 0 || 0 || X || ½ || ½ || ½ || ½ || ½ || 1 || 1 || 1 || 6 || 1 || 3 || 29.50 || 2776 || 80
|-
| 5 || align=left |  || 2764
| 1 || 0 || ½ || ½ || X || ½ || 1 || ½ || ½ || ½ || ½ || ½ || 6 || 1 || 2 || 32.75 || 2777 || 80
|-
| 6 || align=left |  || 2696
| ½ || 1 || ½ || ½ || ½ || X || ½ || ½ || ½ || ½ || ½ || ½ || 6 || 1 || 1 || 33.25 || 2783 || 80
|-
| 7 || align=left |  || 2747
| ½ || ½ || ½ || ½ || 0 || ½ || X || ½ || 1 || ½ || ½ || ½ || 5½ || 1.5 || 1 || 30.00 || 2747 || 50
|-
| 8 || align=left |  || 2732
| ½ || ½ || 0 || ½ || ½ || ½ || ½ || X || ½ || ½ || ½ || 1 || 5½ || 1 || 1 || 28.75 || 2748 || 50
|-
| 9 || align=left |  || 2741
| 0 || ½ || 1 || ½ || ½ || ½ || 0 || ½ || X || ½ || 1 || ½ || 5½ || 0.5 || 2 || 29.50 || 2747 || 50
|-
| 10 || align=left |  || 2751
| ½ || ½ || ½ || 0 || ½ || ½ || ½ || ½ || ½ || X || ½ || 0 || 4½ || 0 || 0 || 26.00 || 2683 || 30
|-
| 11 || align=left |  || 2726
| 0 || ½ || 0 || 0 || ½ || ½ || ½ || ½ || 0 || ½ || X || 1 || 4 || 0 || 1 || 20.50 || 2652 || 20
|-
| 12 || align=left |  || 2762
| ½ || 0 || 0 || 0 || ½ || ½ || ½ || 0 || ½ || 1 || 0 || X || 3½ || 0 || 1 || 19.25 || 2614 || 10
|}

Zug 2013
{| class="wikitable" style="text-align:center;"
|+ 3rd stage, Zug, Switzerland, 18–30 April 2013
! !! Player !! Rating !! 1 !! 2 !! 3 !! 4 !! 5 !! 6 !! 7 !! 8 !! 9 !! 10 !! 11 !! 12 !! Total !! H2H !! Wins !! SB !! TPR !! GP
|-
|-style="background:#ccffcc;"
| 1 || align=left |  || 2771
| X || 1 || ½ || 1 || ½ || 1 || 1 || ½ || 1 || ½ || ½ || ½ || 8 || 0 || 5 || 43.00 || 2924 || 170
|-
| 2 || align=left |  || 2767
| 0 || X || ½ || ½ || ½ || 1 || ½ || ½ || ½ || ½ || 1 || 1 || 6½ || 0 || 3 || 33.00 || 2818 || 140
|-
| 3 || align=left |  || 2733
| ½ || ½ || X || 1 || 1 || ½ || ½ || ½ || ½ || 0 || ½ || ½ || 6 || 1 || 2 || 33.50 || 2789 || 100
|-
| 4 || align=left |  || 2772
| 0 || ½ || 0 || X || 1 || ½ || ½ || ½ || ½ || 1 || 1 || ½ || 6 || 0 || 3 || 30.25 || 2785 || 100
|-
| 5 || align=left |  || 2741
| ½ || ½ || 0 || 0 || X || 1 || 1 || ½ || ½ || 1 || 0 || ½ || 5½ || 1 || 3 || 29.50 || 2756 || 75
|-
| 6 || align=left |  || 2758
| 0 || 0 || ½ || ½ || 0 || X || ½ || 1 || ½ || 1 || 1 || ½ || 5½ || 0 || 3 || 27.25 || 2756 || 75
|-
| 7 || align=left |  || 2786
| 0 || ½ || ½ || ½ || 0 || ½ || X || ½ || ½ || ½ || ½ || 1 || 5 || 1 || 1 || 26.00 || 2722 || 50
|-
| 8 || align=left |  || 2727
| ½ || ½ || ½ || ½ || ½ || 0 || ½ || X || ½ || ½ || ½ || ½ || 5 || 1 || 0 || 27.75 || 2727 || 50
|-
| 9 || align=left |  || 2744
| 0 || ½ || ½ || ½ || ½ || ½ || ½ || ½ || X || ½ || ½ || ½ || 5 || 1 || 0 || 26.50 || 2725 || 50
|-
| 10 || align=left |  || 2793
| ½ || ½ || 1 || 0 || 0 || 0 || ½ || ½ || ½ || X || ½ || ½ || 4½ || 1 || 1 || 25.25 || 2689 || 20
|-
| 11 || align=left |  || 2709
| ½ || 0 || ½ || 0 || 1 || 0 || ½ || ½ || ½ || ½ || X || ½ || 4½ || 1 || 1 || 24.50 || 2696 || 20
|-
| 12 || align=left |  || 2766
| ½ || 0 || ½ || ½ || ½ || ½ || 0 || ½ || ½ || ½ || ½ || X || 4½ || 1 || 0 || 25.00 || 2691 || 20
|}

Thessaloniki 2013
{| class="wikitable" style="text-align:center;"
|+ 4th stage, Thessaloniki, Greece, 22 May – 3 June 2013
! !! Player !! Rating !! 1 !! 2 !! 3 !! 4 !! 5 !! 6 !! 7 !! 8 !! 9 !! 10 !! 11 !! 12 !! Total !! H2H !! Wins !! SB !! TPR !! GP
|-
|-style="background:#ccffcc;"
| 1 || align=left |  || 2723
| X || 1 || 0 || ½ || ½ || 1 || ½ || 1 || 1 || ½ || 1 || 1 || 8 || 0 || 6 || 40.00 || 2926 || 170
|-
| 2 || align=left |  || 2774
| 0 || X || 1 || ½ || ½ || ½ || ½ || 1 || ½ || 1 || 1 || 1 || 7½ || 1 || 5 || 37.00 || 2883 || 125
|-
| 3 || align=left |  || 2741
| 1 || 0 || X || ½ || ½ || 1 || 1 || ½ || 1 || ½ || 1 || ½ || 7½ || 0 || 5 || 39.00 || 2886 || 125
|-
| 4 || align=left |  || 2742
| ½ || ½ || ½ || X || ½ || 0 || ½ || ½ || ½ || 1 || ½ || 1 || 6 || 0.5 || 2 || 31.00 || 2785 || 85
|-
| 5 || align=left |  || 2779
| ½ || ½ || ½ || ½ || X || ½ || 1 || ½ || ½ || ½ || ½ || ½ || 6 || 0.5 || 1 || 32.50 || 2782 || 85
|-
| 6 || align=left |  || 2699
| 0 || ½ || 0 || 1 || ½ || X || 1 || ½ || ½ || ½ || ½ || ½ || 5½ || 0 || 2 || 28.00 || 2757 || 70
|-
| 7 || align=left |  || 2775
| ½ || ½ || 0 || ½ || 0 || 0 || X || 1 || 1 || ½ || ½ || ½ || 5 || 0 || 2 || 25.50 || 2720 || 60
|-
| 8 || align=left |  || 2793
| 0 || 0 || ½ || ½ || ½ || ½ || 0 || X || ½ || 0 || 1 || 1 || 4½ || 0.5 || 2 || 22.25 || 2686 || 45
|-
| 9 || align=left |  || 2769
| 0 || ½ || 0 || ½ || ½ || ½ || 0 || ½ || X || 1 || 0 || 1 || 4½ || 0.5 || 2 || 22.25 || 2688 || 45
|-
| 10 || align=left |  || 2725
| ½ || 0 || ½ || 0 || ½ || ½ || ½ || 1 || 0 || X || ½ || 0 || 4 || 0.5 || 1 || 22.50 || 2659 || 25
|-
| 11 || align=left |  || 2760
| 0 || 0 || 0 || ½ || ½ || ½ || ½ || 0 || 1 || ½ || X || ½ || 4 || 0.5 || 1 || 19.50 || 2656 || 25
|-
| 12 || align=left |  || 2755
| 0 || 0 || ½ || 0 || ½ || ½ || ½ || 0 || 0 || 1 || ½ || X || 3½ || 0 || 1 || 18.00 || 2621 || 10
|}

Beijing 2013
{| class="wikitable" style="text-align:center;"
|+ 5th stage, Beijing, China, 4–16 July 2013
! !! Player !! Rating !! 1 !! 2 !! 3 !! 4 !! 5 !! 6 !! 7 !! 8 !! 9 !! 10 !! 11 !! 12 !! Total !! H2H !! Wins !! SB !! TPR !! GP
|-
|-style="background:#ccffcc;"
| 1 || align=left |  || 2761
| X || 0 || 1 || ½ || 1 || ½ || 0 || 1 || ½ || 1 || 1 || ½ || 7 || 0 || 5 || 37.00 || 2847 || 170
|-
| 2 || align=left |  || 2780
| 1 || X || ½ || ½ || ½ || 1 || ½ || ½ || 0 || ½ || ½ || 1 || 6½ || 0 || 3 || 35.25 || 2812 || 140
|-
| 3 || align=left |  || 2767
| 0 || ½ || X || ½ || 1 || ½ || 1 || 0 || 1 || ½ || ½ || ½ || 6 || 0.5 || 3 || 31.75 || 2781 || 100
|-
| 4 || align=left |  || 2737
| ½ || ½ || ½ || X || 1 || ½ || ½ || ½ || ½ || ½ || ½ || ½ || 6 || 0.5 || 1 || 32.75 || 2784 || 100
|-
| 5 || align=left |  || 2776
| 0 || ½ || 0 || 0 || X || ½ || 1 || 1 || ½ || 1 || ½ || ½ || 5½ || 2.5 || 3 || 28.75 || 2750 || 65
|-
| 6 || align=left |  || 2705
| ½ || 0 || ½ || ½ || ½ || X || ½ || ½ || ½ || 1 || 0 || 1 || 5½ || 1.5 || 2 || 28.75 || 2755 || 65
|-
| 7 || align=left |  || 2736
| 1 || ½ || 0 || ½ || 0 || ½ || X || ½ || 1 || ½ || 0 || 1 || 5½ || 1 || 3 || 29.75 || 2752 || 65
|-
| 8 || align=left |  || 2734
| 0 || ½ || 1 || ½ || 0 || ½ || ½ || X || 1 || 0 || ½ || 1 || 5½ || 1 || 3 || 28.75 || 2753 || 65
|-
| 9 || align=left |  || 2773
| ½ || 1 || 0 || ½ || ½ || ½ || 0 || 0 || X || ½ || 1 || ½ || 5 || 1.5 || 2 || 27.75 || 2718 || 30
|-
| 10 || align=left |  || 2752
| 0 || ½ || ½ || ½ || 0 || 0 || ½ || 1 || ½ || X || ½ || 1 || 5 || 1 || 2 || 26.00 || 2720 || 30
|-
| 11 || align=left |  || 2733
| 0 || ½ || ½ || ½ || ½ || 1 || 1 || ½ || 0 || ½ || X || 0 || 5 || 0.5 || 2 || 28.25 || 2722 || 30
|-
| 12 || align=left |  || 2763
| ½ || 0 || ½ || ½ || ½ || 0 || 0 || 0 || ½ || 0 || 1 || X || 3½ || 0 || 1 || 19.75 || 2618 || 10
|}

Paris 2013
{| class="wikitable" style="text-align:center;"
|+ 6th stage, Paris, France, 22 September – 4 October 2013
! !! Player !! Rating !! 1 !! 2 !! 3 !! 4 !! 5 !! 6 !! 7 !! 8 !! 9 !! 10 !! 11 !! 12 !! Total !! H2H !! Wins !! SB !! TPR !! GP
|-
|-style="background:#ccffcc;"
| 1 || align=left |  || 2779
| X || 1 || 0 || ½ || ½ || ½ || 1 || ½ || 1 || ½ || 1 || ½ || 7|| 1 || 4 || 30.00 || 2840 || 155
|-
|-style="background:#ccffcc;"
| 2 || align=left |  || 2764
| 0 || X || 1 || ½ || 1 || 1 || ½ || ½ || ½ || ½ || ½ || 1 || 7|| 0 || 4 || 30.00 || 2841 || 155
|-
| 3 || align=left |  || 2772
| 1 || 0 || X || 1 || ½ || ½ || 1 || ½ || ½ || ½ || ½ || ½ || 6½ || 1 || 3 || 28.50 || 2807 || 100
|-
| 4 || align=left |  || 2723
| ½ || ½ || 0 || X || ½ || ½ || ½ || 1 || ½ || ½ || 1 || 1 || 6½ || 0 || 3 || 28.00|| 2811 || 100
|-
| 5 || align=left |  || 2785
| ½ || 0 || ½ || ½ || X || ½ || 1 || ½ || ½ || ½ || 0 || 1 || 5½ || ½ || 2 || 23.75 || 2743 || 75
|-
| 6 || align=left |  || 2757
| ½ || 0 || ½ || ½ || ½ || X || ½ || ½ || ½ || ½ || ½ || 1 || 5½ || ½ || 1 || 25.00 || 2745 || 75
|-
| 7 || align=left |  || 2731
| 0 || ½ || 0 || ½ || 0 || ½ || X || ½ || ½ || 1 || 1 || ½ || 5 || 2 || 2 || 20.75 || 2716 || 45
|-
| 8 || align=left |  || 2756
| ½ || ½ || ½ || 0 || ½ || ½ || ½ || X || ½ || ½ || ½ || ½ || 5 || 1½ || 0 || 23.75 || 2714 || 45
|-
| 9 || align=left |  || 2703
| 0 || ½ || ½ || ½ || ½ || ½ || ½ || ½ || X || ½ || ½ || ½ || 5 || 1½ || 0 || 23.50 || 2718 || 45
|-
| 10 || align=left |  || 2736
| ½ || ½ || ½ || ½ || ½ || ½ || 0 || ½ || ½ || X || ½ || ½ || 5 || 1 || 0 || 24.50 || 2716 || 45
|-
| 11 || align=left |  || 2708
| 0 || ½ || ½ || 0 || 1 || ½ || 0 || ½ || ½ || ½ || X || ½ || 4½ || 0 || 1 || 18.75 || 2686 || 20
|-
| 12 || align=left |  || 2737
| ½ || 0 || ½ || 0 || 0 || 0 || ½ || ½ || ½ || ½ || ½ || X || 3½ || 0 || 0 || 15.50 || 2615 || 10
|}

Grand Prix standings
Grand Prix points in bold indicate a tournament win. A number in brackets is a player's worst result of four and doesn't add to the total.

Veselin Topalov finished first, and Shakhriyar Mamedyarov was second in the overall standings. Thus, they qualified for the 2014 Candidates Tournament.

Karjakin and Svidler qualified for the Candidates by other paths, so are shown in light green.

Notes
 In the London Grand Prix, Adams replaced Svidler, who withdrew for family reasons. 
 Kamsky replaced Gashimov, who had to withdraw his place due to illness before playing in any Grand Prix.
 In the Thessaloniki Grand Prix, Bacrot replaced Radjabov, who withdrew for personal reasons.
 Wang Yue replaced Radjabov in the Beijing Grand Prix.
 Tomashevsky, Fressinet and Bacrot replaced Karjakin, Radjabov and Svidler in the Paris Grand Prix.

References

External links
FIDE Grand Prix: Official site
FIDE Grand Prix 2012–2013: Regulations

FIDE Grand Prix
2012 in chess
2013 in chess